It was a Dacian fortified town in modern day Romania.

References

Dacian fortresses in Harghita County
Ancient history of Transylvania